Spying for other countries or groups is in many cases illegal and punishable by law. The following is a list of individuals that have either been imprisoned for spying, or individuals that have been arrested in connection to their spying activities.

See also
List of people convicted of treason

References

Incarcerated spies